= Sant Antoni de Benaixeve =

Village in Spain

Sant Antoni de Benaixeve is a village in the province of Valencia and autonomous community of Valencian Community, Spain.
